Panagia Gremniotissa or Panagia Gremiotissa is a Greek Orthodox church in Ios, Greece.

Legend
According to the legend, during the Ottoman occupation of Greece, some people in Crete afraid of the Ottomans wanting to protect their religion and its symbols put a religious image of Panagia in a wooden raft with a candle on it with hopes that someone will find it and rescue the image. Later on, some Herder during a night noticed a light in Milopota's beach and found the raft and the image. Then, they took it and gave it to the church of Saint Nikolas. The next morning, according to the legend, the image mysteriously moved to the church of Saint Eleftherios in Palaiokastro. After the phenomenon was repeated three times, convinced by her miracles, the locals decided to built a church for the image, but every time they started building they found the bricks next to the Church of Saint Eleftherios. After that, the people of Ios decided to built the church in a place where Crete is visible, and people of all ages from all over the island got together and started building the church.

Name
The church, due to its high altitude as being almost on the top of Chora's cliff has the name Gremniotissa with means 'of the cliff', and Panagia is the patron saint. All together literally means Virgin Mary of the Cliff.

References

Ios
Eastern Orthodox church buildings in Greece
Churches completed in 1797